Bridgerton is an American historical fiction-romance streaming television series created by Chris Van Dusen for Netflix. Based on the book series by Julia Quinn, it is Shondaland's first scripted show for Netflix. It revolves around the eponymous Bridgerton family and is set in the competitive world of Regency era London's ton during the social season where marriageable youth of nobility and gentry are launched into society.

The first season debuted on December 25, 2020. The second season premiered on March 25, 2022. By April 2021, the series was renewed for a third and fourth season.

The show's record-setting second season, which surpassed season one in viewership, cemented Bridgerton as a franchise per Entertainment Weekly.

Premise
Set against the backdrop of the Regency era, the eight close-knit siblings of the noble and powerful Bridgerton family – Anthony, Benedict, Colin, Daphne, Eloise, Francesca, Gregory and Hyacinth – navigate London high society in search of love, surrounded by friends and rivals alike.

Bridgerton family tree

Cast and characters

Main

 Adjoa Andoh as Lady Danbury, the sharp-tongued, insightful doyenne of London society
 Julie Andrews as the voice of Lady Whistledown, the author of a scandalous society newsletter
 Lorraine Ashbourne as Mrs. Varley, the Featheringtons' housekeeper
 Jonathan Bailey as Anthony, 9th Viscount Bridgerton, the eldest Bridgerton son and head of the family
 Ruby Barker as Marina, Lady Crane (née Thompson) (season 1; guest season 2), a Featherington cousin from a rural gentry family
 Sabrina Bartlett as Siena Rosso (season 1), an opera singer and Anthony's former lover
 Harriet Cains as Philippa Finch (née Featherington), the middle Featherington daughter
 Bessie Carter as Prudence Featherington, the eldest Featherington daughter
 Nicola Coughlan as Penelope Featherington, the youngest Featherington daughter and close friend of Eloise
 Phoebe Dynevor as Daphne Basset (née Bridgerton) (seasons 1–2), Duchess of Hastings, the fourth Bridgerton child and eldest daughter
 Ruth Gemmell as Violet, Dowager Viscountess Bridgerton, mother of the Bridgerton children
 Florence Hunt as Hyacinth Bridgerton, the eighth and youngest Bridgerton child
 Claudia Jessie as Eloise Bridgerton, the fifth Bridgerton child and second daughter
 Ben Miller as Archibald, Baron Featherington (season 1), the patriarch of the Featherington family
 Luke Newton as Colin Bridgerton, the third Bridgerton son
 Regé-Jean Page as Simon Basset, Duke of Hastings (season 1), one of London's most eligible bachelors
 Golda Rosheuvel as Queen Charlotte
 Ruby Stokes (season 1–2) and Hannah Dodd (season 3) as Francesca Bridgerton, the sixth Bridgerton child and third daughter
 Luke Thompson as Benedict Bridgerton, the second Bridgerton son and an artist
 Will Tilston as Gregory Bridgerton, the seventh Bridgerton child and youngest son
 Polly Walker as Portia, Dowager Baroness Featherington, the matriarch of the Featherington family
 Simone Ashley as Kate, Viscountess Bridgerton (née Sharma) (season 2), a spinster recently arrived from India
 Charithra Chandran as Edwina Sharma (season 2), Kate's younger half-sister
 Shelley Conn as Lady Mary Sharma (née Sheffield) (season 2), Kate's stepmother and Edwina's mother
 Martins Imhangbe as Will Mondrich (season 2; recurring season 1), gentleman's club owner, retired boxer, and confidant of the Duke of Hastings
 Calam Lynch as Theo Sharpe (season 2), an apprentice at the printing shop used by Lady Whistledown who befriends Eloise
 Rupert Young as Jack, Baron Featherington (season 2), the new head of the Featherington family

Recurring
 Molly McGlynn as Rose Nolan, Daphne's loyal maid and confidant
 Joanna Bobin as Lady Cowper, Cressida's mother
 Jessica Madsen as Cressida Cowper, a gossipmonger and Daphne's rival debutante
 Jason Barnett as Jeffries, the Bassets' butler
 Hugh Sachs as Brimsley, the Queen's gossip-mongering secretary
 Geraldine Alexander as Mrs. Wilson, the Bridgertons' housekeeper
 Kathryn Drysdale as Genevieve Delacroix, a high society modiste and dressmaker
 Simon Ludders as Humboldt, the Bridgertons' butler
 Julian Ovenden as Sir Henry Granville, an artist who befriends Benedict
 Oli Higginson as Footman John, a Footman in the Bridgerton household often working for Eloise

Guest
 Jamie Beamish as Nigel, Baron Berbrooke, Daphne's suitor
 Caroline Quentin as Lady Berbrooke, Nigel's mother
 Freddie Stroma as Prince Frederick of Prussia, the Queen's grandnephew
 Amy Beth Hayes as Lady Trowbridge, the hedonistic widow of an earl
 James Fleet as King George III
 Céline Buckens as Kitty Langham, a general's wife
 Chris Fulton as Sir Phillip Crane, Marina's husband, a baronet
 Daphne Di Cinto as Sarah Basset, Duchess of Hastings, Simon's mother
 Richard Pepple as the Duke of Hastings, Simon's father
 Pippa Haywood as Mrs. Colson, the housekeeper at the Hastings' country estate
 Emma Naomi as Alice Mondrich, Will Mondrich's wife
 Anthony Head as Lord Sheffield, Lady Mary's father and Edwina's grandfather 
 Shobu Kapoor as Lady Sheffield, Lady Mary's mother and Edwina's grandmother
 Rupert Evans as Edmund, 8th Viscount Bridgerton, father of the Bridgerton children

Episodes

Series overview

Season 1 (2020)

Season 2 (2022)

Production

Development

Season 1 

On July 20, 2018, Netflix announced that Shonda Rhimes, through her production company Shondaland, would produce the screen adaptation of the bestselling novels of the Bridgerton series by Julia Quinn, while Chris Van Dusen would serve as showrunner. Quinn explained on The Tamron Hall Show that when she heard from her agent that Rhimes was interested in adapting her novels, she "almost fell off of [her] stool", and quickly agreed to the offer. Season 1 of the show adapted The Duke and I, the first book of Quinn's series.

Van Dusen said in a Shondaland article: "I think [period shows] are considered a bit traditional and conservative. With Bridgerton, I wanted to take everything I loved about a period show and turn it into something fresh, topical, and relatable."

Season 2 
Before the first season aired, the show was already in pre-production for a second season which was officially announced in January 2021. It is focused on Anthony and based on the book The Viscount Who Loved Me. On April 13, 2021, creator Van Dusen revealed on Twitter that the series had additionally been renewed for a third and fourth season.

Season 3 
Unlike the first two seasons which followed the order of the book series, the third season will focus on Colin, based on Quinn's fourth novel Romancing Mister Bridgerton. Jess Brownell will serve as writer and showrunner for the third and fourth seasons, replacing Van Dusen.

Casting
Unlike the series of novels, Bridgerton is set in an alternate history with a racially integrated London where people of color are members of the ton, some with titles granted by the sovereign. Creator Chris Van Dusen was inspired by historical debate over the 1940s African ancestry claims of Queen Charlotte "...to base the show in an alternative history in which Queen Charlotte's mixed race heritage was not only well-established but was transformative for Black people and other people of color in England." Van Dusen says the series is not "color-blind" because "that would imply that color and race were never considered, when color and race are part of the show."

Season 1 
On June 19, 2019, Julie Andrews was cast as Lady Whistledown, whose voice-overs explain much of the series' action. In addition, Phoebe Dynevor and Regé-Jean Page were cast to play the leads with Jonathan Bailey, Golda Rosheuvel, Luke Newton, Claudia Jessie, Nicola Coughlan, Ruby Barker, Sabrina Bartlett, Ruth Gemmell, Adjoa Andoh and Polly Walker co-starring.

Season 2 
On January 21, 2021, it was announced that Jonathan Bailey would be reprising his role as Anthony and would be the center of the show's sophomore season. The following month, Simone Ashley had been cast as Kate. On April 5, 2021, Charithra Chandran joined the cast as Edwina, Rupert Young joined to play a new character, with Shelley Conn cast as Kate and Edwina's mother Mary, and Calam Lynch cast as Theo Sharpe. On May 28, 2021, Rupert Evans joined the cast as Edmund Bridgerton, the late patriarch of the Bridgerton family.

Page did not return for the second season despite being asked to come back as he only signed a one-year deal and wanted to explore other opportunities outside the show. In addition, the plan has always been for each season to focus on a different Bridgerton sibling and their quest for marriage, and his character is insignificant in the succeeding novels.

Season 3 
In April 2022, Bailey and Ashley were confirmed to return for the third season as Viscount and Viscountess Bridgerton, exploring their married life and duties as heads of the eponymous family. The following month, Hannah Dodd was cast to replace Ruby Stokes as Francesca Bridgerton for the third season. Stokes exited the show due to scheduling conflicts. Chandran will not reprise her role as Edwina for the season. In July 2022, Daniel Francis, Sam Phillips, and James Phoon were cast in undisclosed capacities for the third season. In October 2022, Hannah New joined the cast as Lady Tilley Arnold. In January 2023, Dynevor confirmed she will not appear in the third season, but remained open to returning "in the future".

Filming

Season 1
Principal photography commenced in July 2019 and wrapped in late February 2020. Bridgerton was filmed in London and Bath, as well as at various estates and parks around England. Although the series takes place in London, most street scenes were filmed in Bath, York, and Chatham. The grounds of Wilton House were used for Hyde Park and the grounds of Somerley were used for Hampstead Heath. Garden scenes were filmed at Painshill near Cobham and the Commissioner's House in Chatham. Filming locations included Ranger's House in Greenwich (standing in for the Bridgerton House in London exterior); Halton House at RAF Halton (Bridgerton House interior, Featheringtons' interior); Wilton House (Simon's Hastings House, Clyvedon estate interior, St James's Palace throne room); Syon House and Badminton House (Hastings House); Castle Howard (Clyvedon estate); Coneysthorpe (Clyvedon village); Hampton Court Palace and Lancaster House (St. James's Palace); Holburne Museum (Lady Danbury's estate); Hatfield House (Featheringtons' interior); No. 1 Royal Crescent (Grosvenor Square); Queen's House and Somerley (Somerset House); and Dorney Court (coaching inn).

Vauxhall Pleasure Gardens no longer exists in its entirety. The production team recreated it for Lady Danbury's ball by combining the remaining parts with Castle Howard and Stowe Park. The banqueting room at the Guildhall, Bath was used for another ball as well as the Great Hall at Leigh Court in Somerset.

Anthony Bridgerton and Simon Basset meet in the real-life Reform Club on Pall Mall in central London. The scene in which Lady Featherington takes Marina to the slums was filmed at Chatham Dockyard in Kent. Boxing scenes were also filmed here in addition to Normansfield Theatre in Teddington. Theatre scenes were filmed at the Hackney Empire. A café in Bath, Pickled Greens, was used as the site of the Modiste shop and the Bathrooms at No.5 store on Trim Street became the site of Gunter's Tea Shop.

The costuming was led by Ellen Mirojnick and involved over two hundred people and five months of preparation to create 5,000 costumes.

Season 2
Production on the second season began in March 2021. In May 2021, it was reported that the Royal Borough of Windsor and Maidenhead refused permission to build a film set for the second season in Sunninghill Park near Windsor, despite royal approval. On July 15, 2021, production on the second season was paused for 24 hours when a crew member tested positive for COVID-19, but resumed the following day. However, on July 17, production was halted indefinitely following a second positive test. Production resumed in August 2021. Production for the second season wrapped on November 20, 2021.

New filming locations for season 2 included Wrotham Park (standing in for the Bridgertons' country home Aubrey Hall); West Wycombe Park (Aubrey Hall interior and the Crane estate); Wrest Park, Ivinghoe Beacon, and Ashridge (the Orangery and Aubrey Hall grounds); the Royal County of Berkshire Polo Club (Royal Ascot); Old Royal Naval College; Windsor Great Park (woods scenes); Goldsmiths' Hall (Buckingham palace throne room); and Wilton's Music Hall (feminist meeting place). The real St James's Church is in the series. The art display at Petworth House was used for the museum scene, with Royal Artillery Barracks used as the exterior. The finale ball was filmed at Basildon Park.

Season 3 
The third season began principal photography in July 2022 and wrapped in March 2023.

Music
American composer and pianist Kris Bowers composed and arranged the score for the series. Bowers wrote and composed the first season's soundtrack, featuring nineteen songs.  Musicians recorded the score remotely from their home studios during the COVID-19 pandemic.

Season 1 
The first season featured orchestral covers of contemporary popular music, which director and executive producer Julie Anne Robinson said was inspired by the use of classic rock songs in the 2001 film A Knight's Tale. Songs featured included Ariana Grande's "Thank U, Next", Maroon 5's "Girls Like You", Shawn Mendes's "In My Blood" and Billie Eilish's "Bad Guy", all four of which performed by Vitamin String Quartet.  Also included are Celeste's "Strange" performed by Bowers, and Taylor Swift's "Wildest Dreams" performed by Duomo. Bowers also included modern interpretations of classical music, such as Bach's Cello Suite No. 6 in D major from Peter Gregson's Recomposed by Peter Gregson: Bach – The Cello Suites and Vivaldi's The Four Seasons from Max Richter's Recomposed by Max Richter: Vivaldi – The Four Seasons. The first season also included JPOLND's "The End" which has a "swingy melody but intense lyrics".

Season 2 
In the second season, covers include Nirvana's "Stay Away" and Robyn's "Dancing On My Own" by Vitamin String Quartet, Madonna's "Material Girl", "Kabhi Khushi Kabhie Gham" from the soundtrack of the film of the same name and Calvin Harris' "How Deep Is Your Love" by Bowers. Also included are Alanis Morissette's "You Oughta Know" and Pink's "What About Us" by Duomo, Harry Styles' "Sign of the Times" by Steve Horner, Rihanna's "Diamonds" by Hannah V and Joe Rodwell and Miley Cyrus' "Wrecking Ball" by Midnight String Quartet. To promote the show, Morisette appeared in a video performing "You Oughta Know" with Duomo. When discussing the music of season two, music supervisor Justin Kramps explained that "even for these songs that are just huge songs that everyone knows, [an instrumental version] still breathes new life and brings them to a new audience, and in a different way. Pop is where we start, because it fits the style of the show, and it's often using these super-recognizable songs that just add a lot of joy, which is what pop does in general."

Release

Season 1 
The eight episodes of the first season of Bridgerton began streaming on Netflix on December 25, 2020.

Season 2 
A preview of a scene from season 2 aired during Netflix's September 2021 TUDUM: Extended Talent Panel, which was followed by first look stills. On February 14, 2022, the first teaser trailer for the second season was released. A world premiere was held at Tate Modern on March 22, 2022, in London, England prior to the season's eight episodes being released on March 25, 2022.

Due to a three-month commitment as the lead in the acclaimed West End play Cock, Jonathan Bailey had missed "press, talk shows, FYC events, and even the Met Gala" as part of the show's promotion.

Reception

Critical response

Season 1 
For the first season, the review aggregator website Rotten Tomatoes reported an approval rating of 87% based on 99 reviews, with an average rating of 7.9/10. The website's critics consensus reads, "Sumptuous design, soapy drama, and a sterling cast make Bridgerton a delightful treat." Metacritic gave the series a weighted average score of 75 out of 100 based on 34 reviews, indicating "generally favorable reviews."

Kristen Baldwin of Entertainment Weekly gave the series a B+ and wrote, "Bridgerton, it seems, is a wonderful diversion for those who love Pride & Prejudice but wish it had more stairway sex." Richard Roeper of Chicago Sun-Times gave the series four out of four stars and called it "A show that will give you that unmistakable binge twinge and have you activating that "Next Episode" time and again, until there are no more "Next Episodes"." British GQ described Bridgerton as a cross between Downton Abbey and Gossip Girl, but noted that it "may just end up being another disappointment" and "it could have been brilliant." Salamishah Tillet of The New York Times said "Bridgerton provides a blueprint for British period shows in which Black characters can thrive within the melodramatic story lines, extravagant costumes and bucolic beauty [...] without having to be servants or enslaved." Erum Salam of Cosmopolitan wrote "I kept wanting more. I wanted more explanations of how race factored into this society..." Carolyn Hinds from The Observer stated "Bridgerton has been praised as a racially diverse show set in the Regency Era". Vanity Fair Caroline Framke describes the sex in the series "isn't altogether shocking material for Shondaland to mine for its first drama series absent broadcast restraints."

The first season's 6th episode drew criticism with regard to the non-consensual nature of Simon and Daphne's lovemaking, which amounted to marital rape. The episode depicts Daphne, while having sex with Simon, changing her position to be on top, preventing Simon from pulling out of her when he climaxes despite his objections, to ensure he impregnates her. Described as one of the toxic plot points of their relationship, it further drew scrutiny due to the fact that the deceit was never addressed as sexual assault in the series. Critics pointed out that it failed to acknowledge the difficulties of male victims of rape, and the further fetishisation of black men in media.

Season 2 

For the second season, Rotten Tomatoes reported an approval rating of 78% based on 89 reviews, with an average rating of 7.2/10. The website's critics consensus states, "The risqué thrill may have faded, but Bridgerton remains a compulsive episode-turner in this delightful sophomore season." Metacritic gave the series a weighted average score of 70 out of 100 based on 32 reviews, indicating "generally favorable reviews."

Kristen Baldwin of Entertainment Weekly gave the series an A- writing, "With a second season that's more clever, moving, and emotionally complex than the first, this period drama... proves that it's not just a titillating trifle." The Hollywood Reporter's Angie Hahn echoed the sentiment describing the season as "older and wiser" than its predecessor's "rampant horniness" with an effective central romance that prioritized "a meeting of minds, played out over quick-witted arguments outside ballrooms and vicious competition during a friendly family game of pall-mall." Peter Travers of ABC praised the season writing, "Kudos to season two for digging deeper into the emotional lives of its characters and continuing the colorblind casting that creates a utopia in which diversity is so ingrained it's hardly worth a mention."

Alison Herman of The Ringer commented that Season 1 is "sexy without quite being erotic" while "Season 2 is the reverse. There's not a lot of sex, but in the crackling chemistry and relentless self-denial that defines Anthony and Kate's dynamic, there's plenty of eroticism." Emma Clarke of The Independent argued that, "it is precisely the lack of physicality that makes this season (of the show and of courtship) so... well, sexy." Scott Bryan of the BBC wrote that the season serves as antidote to the "always static, laboured and slow" period dramas, adding that it comes with "real energy, it feels so modern (even though it is set in the past) and even though it feels extravagant, it doesn't feel too highbrow. It is refreshingly accessible."

Kevin Fallon of The Daily Beast elaborating on Bailey's "exquisite lead performance," wrote that "he has an exceptional ability to carry his angst, pain, and guilt with him without bogging down things into a somber drag." The Telegraph''' s Anita Singh wrote that Bailey "brings more soul to the role of Lord Bridgerton than Page ever did with the Duke," with Randy Myers of Mercury News adding that Bailey "has a gift at comedic timing." Proma Khosla of Mashable concluded that with "Bailey and Ashley, Bridgerton Season 2 strikes gold" as they deliver "heaping, smoldering helpings of sexual tension" for "their chemistry is nothing short of explosive."

Audience viewership

 Season 1 
On January 27, 2021, Netflix announced that 82 million households have watched at least two minutes of the season amounting to 625,490,000 million hours viewed. It was the most-watched original series launch on the service at the time of its premiere, prior to being surpassed by Squid Game in October 2021. Caroline Framke of Variety attributed this huge viewership to "the perfect storm of a perfectly timed premiere (Christmas Day of 2020), providing silly and sexy entertainment after the first terrible year of COVID."

 Season 2 
Season 2 premiered on March 25, 2022, and debuted number one in 92 countries on the platform. It was also the most viewed show on United States television screens for three weeks per Nielsen Media Research. Season 2 amassed 193 million viewing hours in its opening weekend, the highest opening for any English-language Netflix series at the time. It also broke the record for most viewed English-language series in a single week at that time, with 251.74 million viewing hours from March 28 to April 3. The first season also re-entered Netflix's top ten in second place. By April 19, Bridgertons second season had overtaken its predecessor as the most watched English-language television series on Netflix at the time with 627.11 million hours viewed since its March 25, 2022, launch. This viewing numbers went up to 656.16 million by the 28-day mark.

Nielsen Media Research, analyzing the 2.55 billion minutes viewed on United States television screens in the first three days of season 2's availability (double all others across streamers for the week of March 21), characterized Bridgerton's audience as "diverse and broad". The firm found one third of viewers to be Hispanic or African American and an even split in popularity across the 18–34, 35–49, and 50–64 age groups at 25% each. The only exception was gender parity with 76% of the audience reported to be female. It added 3.2 billion minutes viewed in its second week on top of the chart. It topped the chart for a third week with 1.6 billion minutes viewed.

 Historical inaccuracies 

Chris Van Dusen has said that the show "is a reimagined world, we're not a history lesson, it's not a documentary. What we're really doing with the show is marrying history and fantasy in what I think is a very exciting way. One approach that we took to that is our approach to race." The Bridgerton family, Lady Whistledown and most of the other characters in the show are fictional.

The theory that Queen Charlotte may have had African ancestry has been called an unhistorical assertion by most scholars. In an interview with Insider magazine, American historian Marlene Koenig said the show's representation of Regency-era London was more diverse than it was in reality, adding that "diversity as we know what the word means did not exist" in Britain during that period. Some classical music pieces used in the first season were composed later than 1813, the year of the first season. Examples include Dmitri Shostakovich's Suite for Jazz Orchestra No. 2, which was written in 1938 and "Belle nuit, ô nuit d'amour" from Jacques Offenbach's 1881 opera The Tales of Hoffmann.

Historians have pointed out inaccuracies in clothing, such as the show using corsets to represent the oppression placed on women in society instead of supportive undergarments as they were considered in the Regency era. In a scene from season 1, Daphne is seen with bruises on her back from the corset, however at the time it was common to wear a chemise under it to prevent this. Fabrics and patterns appearing in the show are too modern compared to the ones used in the historical period in which the events are supposed to take place.

Cultural impact
Fashion and interior design trends influenced or made popular by the series have been dubbed "Regencycore" or "the Bridgerton effect". Lyst reported an increase in searches for items such as corsets, headpieces, and elbow-length gloves after the series' premiere. The series' female leads Daphne and Kate were also linked to a popularity in the colours sky blue and lilac respectively. In 2021, Abigail Barlow and Emily Bear wrote a concept album based on characters and situations in season 1 of the series titled The Unofficial Bridgerton Musical; it won the 2022 Grammy Award for Best Musical Theater Album.Burack, Emily. "The Unofficial Bridgerton Musical Wins a Grammy" , Town & Country, April 4, 2022 After the two presented the songs from the album live in concert at the Kennedy Center in July 2022, Netflix sued them for copyright infringement.

To ring in the second season, an official "Queen's Ball" was held in Washington DC, Chicago, Montréal, and Los Angeles, with similar events and experiences taking place in London and Johannesburg. Bloomingdale's put together a Bridgerton-themed pop-up collection and tea bar, displaying real costumes from the series in the U.S. for the first time in its 59th Street windows.

After season 2 featured the main characters playing pall-mall, a lawn game considered to be the precursor to croquet, retailer John Lewis reported a 90% rise in sales for croquet sets. There was also a notable increase in internet searches and purchases of tiaras and corsets after season two's premiere.

Stately homes around England saw an uptick in interest and visitors. Regarding Ranger's House, Chris Small of English Heritage said, "Since the launch of Bridgerton in 2020 we have seen many people who were previously unaware of the site inspired to visit." Walking tours of the filming locations of the series have also been created, including an official one by Netflix. Castle Howard opened an exhibition titled Castle Howard on Screen: From Brideshead to Bridgerton in May 2022.

The 33rd season finale episode of The Simpsons on May 22, 2022, featured Marge and her friends watching a period drama called "Tunnelton" with a Lady Whistledown-sounding narrator, and a character emerging drenched from a lake, like Anthony in the fifth episode of the second season.

 Limited prequel series 

In May 2021, Netflix ordered a limited prequel series from Shondaland which will focus on young Queen Charlotte, a character who does not appear in the Bridgerton novels. Rhimes will write the spin-off and serve as executive producer alongside Betsy Beers and Tom Verica.

Rosheuvel, Andoh, Gemmell, and Fleet will reprise their roles, while India Amarteifio, Michelle Fairley, Corey Mylchreest, and Arsema Thoma were cast, together with Connie Jenkins-Greig who will play young Violet. A novelization of the series written by Rhimes and Quinn will be released by Avon Books in 2023.

In April 2022, it was reported that production designer Dave Arrowsmith was fired from the series following allegations of abusive behavior and bullying on set. In September 2022, Netflix announced that Queen Charlotte: A Bridgerton Story'' would be the title for the series and also released the first look.

Awards and nominations

References

External links

 
 
 Official season 2 premiere screenplay

 
2020 American television series debuts
2020s American drama television series
2020s American romance television series
2020s romantic drama television series
American romantic drama television series
Cultural depictions of George III
Costume drama television series
English-language Netflix original programming
Mass media portrayals of the upper class
Primetime Emmy Award-winning television series
Television shows set in Kent
Television shows set in London
Television shows filmed in England
Television shows shot in London
Television series impacted by the COVID-19 pandemic
Television series set in the 1810s
Television series by Shondaland
Television shows based on American novels
Rape in fiction
Rape in television
Works about marriage